Naratorn Pornjitkittichai (born October 24, 1999), is a Thai professional footballer who plays as an attacking midfielder for Thai League 1 club Chainat Hornbill.

References

1999 births
Living people
Naratorn Pornjitkittichai
Association football midfielders
Naratorn Pornjitkittichai
Naratorn Pornjitkittichai
Naratorn Pornjitkittichai
Naratorn Pornjitkittichai